Poo Yee "Cordia" Tsoi is a Canadian-born former short track speed skater who competed for Hong Kong at the 2002 Winter Olympics. Along with teammate Christy Ren, they became the first athletes to represent Hong Kong at the Winter Olympics.

Tsoi was born in Canada, but grew up in Hong Kong and attended Canadian International School. She competed in Kung Fu (Hong Kong National Team in Wushu 1999-2002) and Triathlon before embarking on a career in speedskating.

After the 2002 Games, Tsoi has since left the sporting world and studied at McGill University in Montreal. She is a psychology and business management graduate.

Tsoi is fluent in English, Cantonese, Mandarin and French.

References

External links
 

1984 births
Living people
Canadian female short track speed skaters
Hong Kong female short track speed skaters
Olympic short track speed skaters of Hong Kong
Short track speed skaters at the 2002 Winter Olympics
Short track speed skaters at the 1999 Asian Winter Games
Canadian people of Hong Kong descent
Canadian emigrants to Hong Kong
McGill University alumni